Owen Fegan (born 1 November 1972) is an Irish musician, singer-songwriter, producer, multi-instrumentalist, photographer and creative director. He is best known as the keyboard player and songwriter with the alternative rock band Rubyhorse. As a solo artist — VEMO — his debut EP Maps of Mars was released on November 17, 2017.

Owen was born in Cork, Ireland, and formed Rubyhorse in 1988 with schoolmates Dave Farrell, Decky Lucey, Joe Philpott, and Gordon Ashe. After the band’s relocation to Boston in 1997, three studio albums (A Lifetime In One Day, How Far Have You Come, and Rise), two major-label recording contracts (Interscope Records and Island Records), a single Sparkle which peaked at #21 on the Billboard charts in the summer of 2002, a collaboration with George Harrison on the track Punchdrunk, TV appearances including Late Show with David Letterman and Late Night with Conan O'Brien, and international tours with artists including R.E.M., INXS, Culture Club, and Def Leppard, Owen played his last show with Rubyhorse at the World Peace Music Awards in Bali, Indonesia in June 2003 and moved to New York City to work on his own music, and pursue his lifelong passions of art and photography.

His photography has appeared in major commercial campaigns, as well as magazines such as SPIN, Rolling Stone, and Blender, as well as Tom Petty’s Runnin' Down A Dream alongside Mark Seliger, Annie Leibovitz, and Danny Clinch (who coincidentally shot the Rise cover for Rubyhorse).

Soon after his move to New York City, Owen joined Spin as creative director, and has held the title at Rolling Stone, New York, and streaming music service Grooveshark. Owen currently serves as Chief Creative Officer at New-York based tech company Yext which filed its "IPO", on 13 April 2017.

In the years since his departure from Rubyhorse, Owen continued to write music, working his way through an array of musical directions while developing his skills as an audio engineer and mixer. In 2013, he built his own studio — The Binery — in New York City and began writing and recording new material under the name VEMO. The EP, entitled Maps of Mars featured four tracks from these sessions which were almost entirely self-performed, recorded, and mixed.

Heaven features drums by Gordon Ashe (Rubyhorse) and lead guitar and additional vocals by Chris Buckle (The Majorleans, The Picture). Buckle also plays additional guitar on My Sad 71. The EP was mastered by Fred Kevorkian (The White Stripes, The National, Ryan Adams) at Avatar Studios in New York City.

In 2019 Fegan relocated to Amsterdam with his family where he has begun working on a new project under the name SVPERGROVP.

Discography

References

External links
 iamvemo.com
 owenfegan.com

1972 births
Living people
Irish rock musicians